Rolando Ruiz (born 26 March 1957) is a Cuban diver. He competed in the men's 3 metre springboard event at the 1980 Summer Olympics.

References

External links
 

1957 births
Living people
Cuban male divers
Olympic divers of Cuba
Divers at the 1980 Summer Olympics
Sportspeople from Havana
Medalists at the 1977 Summer Universiade
Medalists at the 1979 Summer Universiade
Universiade silver medalists for Cuba
Universiade medalists in diving
20th-century Cuban people